This list of listed buildings in Roskilde Municipality lists listed buildings in Roskilde Municipality, Denmark.

List

3670 Veksø Sjælland

4000 Roskilde

4040 Jyllinge

4130 Viby Sjælland

See also
 List of churches in Roskilde Municipality

References

External links

 Danish Agency of Culture Ref
 Listed buildings in Roskilde and Lejre (in Danish)
 Skivernes kunstnere

 
Roskilde